The 2019 WNBA season was the 23rd season of the Women's National Basketball Association (WNBA). The Seattle Storm were the defending champions. The regular season began on May 24, with the Atlanta Dream hosting the Dallas Wings and the New York Liberty hosting the Indiana Fever.  The season ended with the Washington Mystics securing their first WNBA Title over the Connecticut Sun three games to two, in a closely contested finals.  Emma Meesseman was named Finals MVP and teammate Elena Delle Donne was named regular season MVP.

2019 WNBA draft 

The Las Vegas Aces had the first pick in the 2019 WNBA draft on April 10, marking the third straight draft in which the franchise won the lottery for the top pick. With the top pick, the Aces selected Jackie Young from Notre Dame.  The draft was televised nationally on the ESPN networks (Round 1 on ESPN2, Rounds 2 and 3 on ESPNU).

Rule changes 
The WNBA Board of Governors approved two rule changes at their November 15, 2018 meeting that would go into effect during the 2019 season.

 The "Clear Path Foul Rule" was simplified to establish "bright line" standards based on a player's positioning.
 The definition of a "Hostile Act" was expanded for purposes of instant replay.

Media coverage

On April 22, 2019, CBS Sports Network announced a multi-year deal with the league to broadcast 40 games a season starting in May 2019. On June 27, 2019, TSN, Sportsnet, and NBA TV Canada announced a multi-year deal with the league to broadcast 53 games combined a season starting on June 28, 2019.

Transactions

Retirement 
Lindsay Whalen announced her retirement on August 13, 2018 that she would retire at the conclusion of the 2018 season. Whalen played 15 seasons with the Connecticut Sun and Minnesota Lynx, winning four titles with the latter.  She retired as the WNBA's all time leader in games won, with 322.
Noelle Quinn announced that she would retire on February 21.  She joined the Seattle Storm as an assistant coach.
Monique Currie announced her retirement via Instagram on February 26.  Currie retired to pursue a career with Nike.
Cappie Pondexter announced her retirement via Instagram on April 17.  Pondexter was the 2007 WNBA Finals MVP and a two time WNBA champion.

Free agency 
Free agency negotiations began on January 15, 2019, with the signing period starting on February 1, 2019.

Coaching changes

Administration
 On June 17, Cathy Engelbert became the first Commissioner of the WNBA (previous top administrators had been titled "President"). She had previously served as CEO of the U.S. member firm of the international professional services firm Deloitte.

Arena changes
 On August 15, 2018 the Seattle Storm announced that they would play their regular season games at the University of Washington's Alaska Airlines Arena while Climate Pledge Arena undergoes renovations for the Seattle Kraken of the NHL. The Storm later announced that of the team's 17 regular-season home games, 12 would be held at Alaska Airlines Arena and the remainder at Angel of the Winds Arena in the northern suburb of Everett, Washington.
 On December 13, 2018 the Atlanta Dream announced that they would return to State Farm Arena, formerly Philips Arena, after playing the previous two seasons at Georgia Tech's McCamish Pavilion while State Farm Arena underwent a $192.5 million renovation.
 The Washington Mystics moved into the St. Elizabeths East Entertainment and Sports Arena beginning with the 2019 season.  The arena's capacity is only 4,200, vastly smaller than the team's former home of Capital One Arena.
 On July 24, 2019, the Phoenix Mercury announced that they would play the 2020 season at Arizona Veterans Memorial Coliseum to accommodate renovations to Talking Stick Resort Arena. The Mercury plans to return to the latter venue upon project completion.
 On September 5, 2019, the Indiana Fever announced that they would move to Butler University's Hinkle Fieldhouse for the entire 2020 and 2021 seasons, plus part of the 2022 season. The move was made necessary by a previously announced project to renovate Bankers Life Fieldhouse, home to both the Fever and the NBA's Indiana Pacers, with most of the work taking place during Pacers offseasons. The Fever plan to return to Bankers Life Fieldhouse upon project completion.

Regular season

All-Star Game

Standings 
Source:

Statistical leaders 
The following shows the leaders in each statistical category during the 2019 regular season.

Schedule

| rowspan=2| Wednesday, April 10 || 7:00 p.m. || colspan=3| 2019 WNBA Draft: first round ||colspan=5| ESPN2 || Nike New York Headquarters, New York City
|-
| 8:00 p.m. || colspan=3| 2019 WNBA Draft: second and third round ||colspan=5| ESPNU || Nike New York Headquarters, New York City
|-
| Thursday, May 9 || 7:00 p.m. || China || @ || New York Liberty || ESPNews || 71–89 || Tied (19) || Warley-Talbert (8) || Tied (5) || Barclays Center4,115
|-
| Friday, May 10 || 8:00 p.m. || Washington Mystics || @ || Minnesota Lynx ||  || 79–86 || Sims (20) || Fowles (11) || Sims (7) || Target Center3,201
|-
| Saturday, May 11 || 10:00 p.m. || Los Angeles Sparks || @ || Phoenix Mercury ||  || 75–82 || Bonner (20) || Bonner (8) || Tied (5) || Talking Stick Resort Arena3,751
|-
| rowspan="2" | Monday, May 13 || 5:00 p.m. || Atlanta Dream || vs. || Dallas Wings ||  || 82–59 || Bentley (15) || Gülich (6) || Tied (5) || Mohegan Sun Arena3,300
|-
| 7:00 p.m. || New York Liberty || @ || Connecticut Sun ||  || 66–100 || J. Jones (19) || J. Thomas (7) || C. Williams (7) || Mohegan Sun Arena3,806
|-
| rowspan="3" | Tuesday, May 14 || 12:00 p.m. || Indiana Fever || @ || Chicago Sky ||  || 69–58 || Tied (11) || McCowan (8) || Vandersloot (6) || Wintrust Arena4,033
|-
| 5:00 p.m. || Atlanta Dream || vs. || New York Liberty ||  || 92–87 || Zahui B. (20) || Zahui B. (8) || 4 tied (4) || Mohegan Sun Arena3,458
|-
| 7:00 p.m. || Dallas Wings || @ || Connecticut Sun ||  || 71–67 || Ogunbowale (19) || J. Jones (14) || Stricklen (4) || Mohegan Sun Arena3,965
|-
| Wednesday, May 15 || 10:00 p.m. || Phoenix Mercury || @ || Seattle Storm ||  || 87–84 || 4 tied (15) || Tied (7) || Canada (5) || Angel of the Winds Arena3,076
|-
| Thursday, May 16 || 12:00 p.m. || Chicago Sky || @ || Indiana Fever ||  || 65–76 || Parker (16) || Tied (7) || Wheeler (8) || Bankers Life Fieldhouse3,794
|-
| rowspan="2" | Friday, May 17 || 7:00 p.m. || Washington Mystics || @ || Atlanta Dream ||  || 75–64 || Walker-Kimbrough (18) || Billings (6) || Montgomery (4) || Albany Civic Center
|-
| 10:30 p.m. || Seattle Storm || @ || Los Angeles Sparks ||  || 85–92 || Tied (18) || Russell (9) || Tied (6) || Hutto-Patterson Gym
|-
| rowspan="3" | Sunday, May 19 || 2:30 p.m. || Connecticut Sun || @ || New York Liberty ||  || 98–79 || Nurse (25) || Charles (6) || C. Williams (6) || Times Union Center
|-
| 3:00 p.m. || Indiana Fever || @ || Dallas Wings ||  || 71–66 || K. Mitchell (26) || McCowan (6) || Johnson (6) || College Park Center3,428
|-
| 3:30 p.m. || Minnesota Lynx || @ || Las Vegas Aces ||  || 79–75 || Sims (25) || Swords (8) || Brown (7) || Cox Pavilion
|-

|-
! style="background:#094480; color:white" | 2019 WNBA regular season
|-

|-
| rowspan=2| Friday, May 24 || rowspan=2| 7:30 p.m. || Dallas Wings || @ || Atlanta Dream ||  || 72–76 || Breland (17) || Johnson (9) || McCarty–Williams (8) || State Farm Arena3,070
|-
| Indiana Fever || @ || New York Liberty || NBA TV || 81–80 || Charles (32) || Charles (12) || Wheeler (5) || Westchester County Center1,965
|-
| rowspan=3| Saturday, May 25 || 3:30 p.m. || Phoenix Mercury || @ || Seattle Storm || ABC || 68–77 || Bonner (31) || Howard (16) || Canada (6) || Angel of the Winds Arena8,500
|-
| 7:30 p.m. || Washington Mystics || @ || Connecticut Sun || Twitter || 69–84 || A. Thomas (23) || J. Jones (14) || Cloud (8) || Mohegan Sun Arena7,913
|-
| 8:00 p.m. || Chicago Sky || @ || Minnesota Lynx ||  || 71–89 || Collier (27) || Shepard (13) || Vandersloot (8) || Target Center8,524
|-
| Sunday, May 26 || 8:00 p.m. || Los Angeles Sparks || @ || Las Vegas Aces || Twitter || 70–83 || Vadeeva (24) || Hamby (14) || Plum (6) || Mandalay Bay Events Center7,249
|-
| Tuesday, May 28 || 7:00 p.m. || Indiana Fever || @ || Connecticut Sun || CBSSN, NESN+ || 77–88 || Wheeler (26) || A. Thomas (10) || Wheeler (9) || Mohegan Sun Arena4,781
|-
| Wednesday, May 29 || 8:00 p.m. || Seattle Storm || @ || Minnesota Lynx || CBSSN, Fox Sports Go || 61–72 || Howard (18) || Fowles (13) || Sims (5) || Target Center8,092
|-
| rowspan=3| Friday, May 31 || 7:30 p.m. || Seattle Storm || @ || Atlanta Dream || CBSSN || 82–66 || Howard (19) || Howard (14) || Canada (7) || State Farm Arena2,119
|-
| 10:00 p.m. || Las Vegas Aces || @ || Phoenix Mercury || ESPN2 || 84–86 || Carson (20) || Bonner (12) || Y. Turner (10) || Talking Stick Resort Arena14,090
|-
| 10:30 p.m. || Connecticut Sun || @ || Los Angeles Sparks || NESN+, ESPN3, Spectrum Sports Net || 70–77 || C. Ogwumike (20) || J. Jones (22) || Tied (4) || Staples Center12,334
|-

|-
| rowspan=4| Saturday, June 1 || rowspan=2| 7:00 p.m. || New York Liberty || @ || Indiana Fever ||  || 77–92 || K. Mitchell (23) || R. Gray (9) || Tied (6) || Bankers Life Fieldhouse 5,003
|-
| Atlanta Dream || @ || Washington Mystics || || 75–96 || Atkins (21) || Hines-Allen (8) || Toliver (5) || St. Elizabeths East Arena4,200
|-
| rowspan=2| 8:00 p.m. || Seattle Storm || @ || Chicago Sky ||  || 79–83 || Quigley (25) || Howard (9) || Vandersloot (11) || Wintrust Arena 7,063
|-
| Minnesota Lynx || @ || Dallas Wings || || 70–67 || Dantas (20) || Fowels (12) || Sims (5) || College Park Center6,535
|-
| Sunday, June 2 || 7:00 p.m. || Connecticut Sun || @ || Las Vegas Aces || League Pass, MYLVTV, NESN || 80–74 || Tied (19) || J. Jones (13) || 3 tied (5) || Mandalay Bay Events Center 2,747
|-
| rowspan=2| Tuesday, June 4 || 11:00 a.m. || Los Angeles Sparks || @ || New York Liberty || League Pass, YES, Spectrum Sportsnet || 78–79 || C. Gray (29) || Charles (14) || Boyd (6) || Westchester County Center3,579
|-
| 10:00 p.m. || Minnesota Lynx || @ || Seattle Storm || Twitter, JoeTV || 77–84 || Loyd (19) || Howard (6) || Canada (7) || Angel of the Winds Arena5,711
|-
| Wednesday, June 5 || 7:00 p.m. || Chicago Sky || @ || Washington Mystics || CBSSN, NBC Sports Washington || 85–103 || DeShields (24) || Delle Donne (7) || Vandersloot (8) || St. Elizabeths East Arena2,347
|-
| rowspan=3| Thursday, June 6 || rowspan=2| 7:00 p.m. || Las Vegas Aces || @ || Atlanta Dream || CBSSN || 92–69 || 3 tied (15) || Breland (9) || J. Young (8) || State Farm Arena2,630
|-
| Los Angeles Sparks || @ || Connecticut Sun || League Pass, NESN+, Spectrum Sportsnet || 77–89 || N. Ogwumike (21) || A. Thomas (12) || Tied (6) || Mohegan Sun Arena5,496
|-
| 8:00 p.m. || Phoenix Mercury || @ || Minnesota Lynx || League Pass, Fox Sports North Plus, Fox Sports Arizona || 56–58 || Bonner (25) || Bonner (8) || Tied (3) || Target Center8,001
|-
| rowspan=2| Friday, June 7 || 7:00 p.m. || Dallas Wings || @ || Indiana Fever || CBSSN || 64–79 || Harrison (18) || Tied (11) || Wheeler (9) || Bankers Life Fieldhouse3,671
|-
| 7:30 p.m. || Washington Mystics || @ || New York Liberty || League Pass, Fox Sports Go, Monumental || 94–85 || Charles (27) || Delle Donne (8) || Cloud (8) || Westchester County Center1,567
|-
| Saturday, June 8 || 3:30 p.m. || Los Angeles Sparks || @ || Minnesota Lynx || ABC|| 89–85 || R. Williams (25) || Fowles (13) || Sims (7) || Target Center8,834
|-
| rowspan=5| Sunday, June 9 || rowspan=3| 3:00 p.m. || Connecticut Sun || @ || Atlanta Dream || League Pass, WSB Now, WTIC || 69–59 || J. Jones (17) || J. Jones (13) || J. Thomas (6) || State Farm Arena3,082
|-
| Las Vegas Aces || @ || New York Liberty || League Pass, Fox Sports Go || 77–88 || McBride(25) || Cambage (10) || Hartley (6) || Westchester County Center1,447
|-
| Dallas Wings || @ || Washington Mystics || League Pass, NBC Sports Washington || 62–86 || Hawkins (21) || Tied (9) || Toliver (6) || St. Elizabeths East Arena3,564
|-
| 4:00 p.m. || Phoenix Mercury || @ || Indiana Fever || NBA TV, Fox Sports Indiana, FSAZ+ || 94–87 || Tied (26) || Tied (7) || Tied (6) || Bankers Life Fieldhouse3,336
|-
| 6:00 p.m. || Seattle Storm || @ || Chicago Sky || NBA TV, The U Too || 71–78 || Tied (20) || Parker (11) || Vandersloot (7) || Wintrust Arena5,032
|-
| rowspan=3| Tuesday, June 11 || rowspan=2| 7:00 p.m. || Washington Mystics || @ || Connecticut Sun || CBSSN, NESN+, Monumental || 75–83 || J. Jones (24) || A. Thomas (9) || Cloud (8) || Mohegan Sun Arena5,224
|-
| Seattle Storm || @ || Indiana Fever || Twitter || 84–82 || Howard (26) || Dupree (15) || K. Mitchell (7) || Bankers Life Fieldhouse3,506
|-
| 8:00 p.m. || Phoenix Mercury || @ || Chicago Sky || League Pass, The U Too || 75–82 || Bonner (28) || Bonner (12) || Vandersloot (8) || Wintrust Arena4,212
|-
| Wednesday, June 12 || 7:00 p.m. || Minnesota Lynx || @ || New York Liberty || League Pass, YES || 69–75 || Nurse (26) || Zahui B. (7) || Tied (7) || Westchester County Center1,181
|-
| Thursday, June 13 || 8:00 p.m. || Indiana Fever || @ || Dallas Wings || CBSSN || 76–72 || Dupree (20) || Laney (11) || T. Mitchell (5) || College Park Center3,562
|-
| rowspan=4| Friday, June 14 || 7:00 p.m. || Seattle Storm || @ || Washington Mystics || CBSSN, NBC Sports Washington || 74–71 || Tied (19) || Tied (11) || Tied (5) || St. Elizabeths East Arena3,654
|-
| 8:00 p.m. || Connecticut Sun || @ || Minnesota Lynx || League Pass, Fox Sports Go, NESN+ || 85–81 || Sims (25) || J. Jones (12) || C. Williams (6) || Target Center8,803
|-
| 10:00 p.m. || Los Angeles Sparks || @ || Phoenix Mercury || CBSSN || 85–68 || Griner (24) || Griner (13) || C. Gray (9) || Talking Stick Resort Arena10,381
|-
| 10:30 p.m. || New York Liberty || @ || Las Vegas Aces || League Pass, MYLVTB || 65–100 || Plum (19) || Wilson (8) || J. Young (8) || Mandalay Bay Events Center4,110
|-
| rowspan=3| Saturday, June 15 || 7:00 p.m. || Chicago Sky || @ || Indiana Fever || League Pass, Fox Sports Indiana, The U Too || 70–64 || Quigley (18) || Parker (10) || Tied (8) || Bankers Life Fieldhouse4,715
|-
| 8:00 p.m. || Atlanta Dream || @ || Dallas Wings || NBA TV, Fox Sports Southwest Plus || 61–71 || Ogunbowale (17) || Tied (8) || Johnson (4) || College Park Center5,220
|-
| 10:00 p.m. || New York Liberty || @ || Los Angeles Sparks || NBA TV, Spectrum Sportsnet || 98–92 || Zahui B. (37) || C. Ogwumike (14) || Boyd (12) || Staples Center11,388
|-
| rowspan=2| Sunday, June 16 || 3:30 p.m. || Seattle Storm || @ || Connecticut Sun || ABC || 81–67 || Tied (20) || J. Jones (11) || J. Jones (6) || Mohegan Sun Arena7,773
|-
| 7:00 p.m. || Las Vegas Aces || @ || Minnesota Lynx || NBA TV, Fox Sports Go || 80–75 || Tied (22) || Tied (9) || Dantas (6) || Target Center8,392
|-
| Tuesday, June 18 || 10:30 p.m. || Washington Mystics || @ || Los Angeles Sparks || CBSSN, Spectrum Sportsnet, Monumental || 81–52 || Atkins (22) || Delle Donne (15) || Toliver (9) || Staples Center9,537
|-
| rowspan=2| Wednesday, June 19 || 11:00 a.m. || Indiana Fever || @ || Atlanta Dream || Twitter, Bounce TV || 88–78 || Hayes (28) || McCowan (14) || Montgomery (9) || State Farm Arena6,474
|-
| 7:00 p.m. || Chicago Sky || @ || New York Liberty || League Pass, YES, The U Too || 91–83 || Vandersloot (25) || Zahui B. (10) || Boyd (7) || Westchester County Center1,585
|-
| rowspan=2| Thursday, June 20 || 8:00 p.m. || Phoenix Mercury || @ || Dallas Wings || CBSSN || 54–69 || Thornton (18) || Tied (11) || 3 tied (3) || College Park Center4,626
|-
| 10:00 p.m. || Washington Mystics || @ || Las Vegas Aces || CBSSN, MyLVTV, Monumental || 95–72 || Delle Donne (29) || Delle Donne (11) || Cloud (7) || Mandalay Bay Events Center4,416
|-
| rowspan=3| Friday, June 21 || 7:30 p.m. || Atlanta Dream || @ || Connecticut Sun || League Pass, NESN+, WSB Now || 76–86 || Stricklen (24) || Tied (8) || J. Thomas (9) || Mohegan Sun Arena6,608
|-
| 8:00 p.m. || Indiana Fever || @ || Chicago Sky || League Pass, The U Too || 76–69 || Wheeler (28) || McCowan (13) || Wheeler (8) || Wintrust Arena4,945
|-
| 10:00 p.m. || Los Angeles Sparks || @ || Seattle Storm || CBSSN, JoeTV, Spectrum SportsNet || 62–84 || Loyd (23) || Clark (10) || 3 tied (3) || Angel of the Winds Arena6,114
|-
| rowspan=2| Saturday, June 22 || 8:00 p.m. || New York Liberty || @ || Minnesota Lynx || NBA TV, Fox Sports North || 83–92 || Nurse (24) || Fowles (10) || Boyd (8) || Target Center8,600
|-
| 10:30 p.m. || Dallas Wings || @ || Las Vegas Aces || League Pass, MyLVTV || 68–86 || Hamby (27) || Thornton (10) || J. Young (8) || Mandalay Bay Events Center4,347
|-
| rowspan=4| Sunday, June 23 || 1:00 p.m. || Washington Mystics || @ || Atlanta Dream || ESPN || 89–73 || Delle Donne (21) || Billings (14) || Tied (6) || State Farm Arena4,136
|-
| rowspan=2| 6:00 p.m. || Connecticut Sun || @ || Chicago Sky || NBA TV, The U Too, NESN || 75–93 || Parker (22) || Lavender (13) || Tied (7) || Wintrust Arena5,607
|-
| Los Angeles Sparks || @ || Phoenix Mercury || League Pass, Fox Sports Arizona+ || 72–82 || Mitchell (22) || N. Ogwumike (14) || C. Gray (7) || Talking Stick Resort Arena10,132
|-
| 7:00 p.m. || Indiana Fever || @ || Seattle Storm || League Pass, JoeTV || 61–65 || Loyd (21) || McCowan (13) || Tied (4) || Alaska Airlines Arena7,211
|-
| rowspan=2| Tuesday, June 25 || 7:00 p.m. || Minnesota Lynx || @ || Indiana Fever || CBSSN || 78–74 || Sims (25) || Fowles (11) || Sims (7) || Bankers Life Fieldhouse4,692
|-
| 10:00 p.m. || Seattle Storm || @ || Las Vegas Aces || Twitter, MyLVTV || 56–60 || Tied (14) || Cambage (13) || Colson (4) || Mandalay Bay Events Center4,215
|-
| rowspan=2| Wednesday, June 26 || 12:00 p.m. || Washington Mystics || @ || Chicago Sky || NBA TV, Monumental || 81–74 || Delle Donne (22) || DeShields (9) || Vandersloot (8) || Wintrust Arena8,914
|-
| 8:00 p.m. || Connecticut Sun || @ || Dallas Wings || NBA TV, Fox Sports Southwest+, NESN || 73–74 || A. Thomas (28) || Tied (7) || J. Thomas (11) || College Park Center4,017
|-
| Thursday, June 27 || 10:30 p.m. || Las Vegas Aces || @ || Los Angeles Sparks || CBSSN, Spectrum SportsNet || 74–86 || 4 tied (18) || Tied (10) || J. Young (9) || Staples Center10,295
|-
| rowspan=3| Friday, June 28 || 7:30 p.m. || Dallas Wings || @ || New York Liberty || USA: League Pass, YESCanada: SN1 || 68–69 || Thornton (20) || R. Gray (11) || Boyd (7) || Westchester County Center2,191
|-
| rowspan=2| 10:00 p.m. || Indiana Fever || @ || Phoenix Mercury || CBSSN || 69–91 || Griner (23) || McCowan (10) || Mitchell (11) || Talking Stick Resort Arena9,435
|-
| Chicago Sky || @ || Seattle Storm || USA: NBA TV, JoeTV, The U TooCanada: TSN2 || 76–79 || DeShields (19) || Lavender (10) || Vandersloot (6) || Alaska Airlines Arena7,915
|-
| rowspan=2| Saturday, June 29 || 2:00 p.m. || Connecticut Sun || @ || Washington Mystics || USA: ESPNCanada: NBA TV Canada || 59–102 || Delle Donne (19) || Delle Donne (10) || Cloud (6) || St. Elizabeths East Arena4,200
|-
| 10:30 p.m. || Indiana Fever || @ || Las Vegas Aces || CBSSN, MyLVTV || 97–102 (OT) || Wilson (39) || Wilson (11) || J. Young (11) || Mandalay Bay Events Center4,581
|-
| rowspan=4| Sunday, June 30 || 3:00 p.m. || New York Liberty || @ || Atlanta Dream || League Pass, WSB Now|| 74–58 || Charles (24) || R. Gray (15) || 5 tied (4) || State Farm Arena4,359
|-
| 4:00 p.m. || Minnesota Lynx || @ || Dallas Wings || League Pass, Fox Sports Southwest+, Fox Sports North+ || 86–89 || Sims (23) || Plaisance (10) || Sims (8) || College Park Center4,521
|-
| 5:00 p.m. || Chicago Sky || @ || Los Angeles Sparks || League Pass, Spectrum SportsNet || 69–94 || DeShields (23) || Parker (11) || Vandersloot (7) || Staples Center11,067
|-
| 7:00 p.m. || Phoenix Mercury || @ ||  Seattle Storm || League Pass, JoeTV || 69–67 || Tied (20) || Tied (7) || Whitcomb (5) || Alaska Airlines Arena8,002
|-

|-
| rowspan=2 | Tuesday, July 2 || 3:00 p.m. || Chicago Sky || @ || Las Vegas Aces || Twitter, MYLVTV || 82–90 || Quigley (18) || Cambage (9) || Vandersloot (12) ||  Mandalay Bay Events Center3,516
|-
| 8:00 p.m. || Atlanta Dream || @ || Minnesota Lynx || CBSSN, Fox Sports Go || 68–85 || Tablot (24) || Collier (11) || Sims (8) || Target Center8,208
|-
| Wednesday, July 3 || 3:00 p.m. || New York Liberty || @ || Seattle Storm || League Pass, JoeTV, WSB Now || 84–83 || Charles (26) || Clark (9) || Boyd (10) || Alaska Airlines Arena8,710
|-
| rowspan=4 | Friday, July 5 || 8:00 p.m. || Indiana Fever || @ || Dallas Wings || CBSSN || 76–56 || T. Mitchell (16) || McCowan (12) || Wheeler (7) ||  College Park Center5,093
|-
| rowspan=2| 10:00 p.m. || New York Liberty || @ || Phoenix Mercury || CBSSN || 80–76 || Nurse (26) || Charles (12) || Boyd (6) || Talking Stick Resort Arena9,560
|-
| Atlanta Dream || @ || Seattle Storm || League Pass, JoeTV, WSB Now || 77–66 || Hayes (21) || Tied (9) || 3 tied (5) || Alaska Airlines Arena8,111
|-
| 10:30 p.m. || Washington Mystics || @ || Las Vegas Aces || League Pass, MYLVTV, Monumental || 99–70 || Delle Donne (21) || Sanders (7) || Cloud (9) || Mandalay Bay Events Center5,024
|-
| Saturday, July 6 || 2:00 p.m. || Minnesota Lynx || @ || Connecticut Sun || USA: ESPN2Canada: TSN5 || 74–71 || Sims (21) || Fowles (11) || Sims (8) || Mohegan Sun Arena8,076
|-
| rowspan=4 | Sunday, July 7 || 3:00 p.m. || Las Vegas Aces || @ || New York Liberty || League Pass, Fox Sports Go || 90–58 || McBride (24) || Cambage (11) || Plum (6) ||  Westchester County Center1,971
|-
| 5:00 p.m. || Washington Mystics || @ || Los Angeles Sparks || League Pass, Spectrum Sportsnet, Monumental || 81–98 || N. Ogwumike (31) || Tied (10) || C. Gray (13) || Staples Center10,336
|-
| rowspan=2| 6:00 p.m. || Dallas Wings || @ || Chicago Sky || League Pass, The U Too || 66–78 || Ogunbowale (22) || Lavender (10) || Vandersloot (11) || Wintrust Arena6,102
|-
| Atlanta Dream || @ || Phoenix Mercury || League Pass, WSB Now || 63–65 || Griner (31) || Bonner (14) || Mitchell (4) || Talking Stick Resort Arena9,850
|-
| Tuesday, July 9 || 1:00 p.m. || Los Angeles Sparks || @ || Dallas Wings || Twitter, Fox Sports Southwest || 62–75 || Thornton (17) || Tied (10) || Tied (4) || College Park Center6,885
|-
| rowspan=4 | Wednesday, July 10 || 11:00 a.m. || Connecticut Sun || @ || Atlanta Dream || USA: NBA TV, Bounce TV, WSB Now, NESN  Canada: NBA TV Canada || 75–78 || Hayes (18) || Breland (13) || Tied (4) || State Farm Arena3,866
|-
| 11:30 a.m. || Phoenix Mercury || @ || Washington Mystics || Twitter || 91–68 || Griner (25) || Griner (8) || Tied (6) || Capital One Arena15,377
|-
| 12:00 p.m. || Las Vegas Aces || @ || Indiana Fever || League Pass || 74–71 || Cambage (19) || McCowan (12) || Wheeler (7) || Bankers Life Fieldhouse9,247
|-
| 9:00 p.m. || Minnesota Lynx || @ || Chicago Sky || CBSSN || 73–72 || Quigley (24) || Fowles (12) || G. Williams (5) || Wintrust Arena8,508
|-
| rowspan=5 | Friday, July 12 || 7:00 p.m. || Los Angeles Sparks || @ || Indiana Fever || League Pass, Fox Sports Indiana || 90–84 || N. Ogwumike (22) || C. Ogwumike (9) || C. Gray (6) || Bankers Life Fieldhouse7,849
|-
| 7:30 p.m. || Minnesota Lynx || @ || Atlanta Dream || League Pass, WSB Now || 53–60 || E. Williams (17) || Fowles (12) || Sims (7) || State Farm Arena4,001
|-
| rowspan=2| 8:00 p.m. || Phoenix Mercury || @ || Connecticut Sun || USA: ESPN2Canada: NBA TV Canada || 64–79 || Tied (20) || J. Jones (11) || J. Thomas (8) || Mohegan Sun Arena6,864
|-
| New York Liberty || @ || Chicago Sky || League Pass, The U Too || 83–99 || Nurse (18) || Dolson (9) || Vandersloot (12) || Wintrust Arena7,221
|-
| 10:00 p.m. || Dallas Wings || @ || Seattle Storm || CBSSN || 81–95 || Ogunbowale (23) || Johnson (9) || Canada (12) || Alaska Airlines Arena6,451
|-
| Saturday, July 13 || 7:00 p.m. || Las Vegas Aces || @ || Washington Mystics || CBSSN, Monumental || 85–81 || Cloud (18) || Sanders (10) || Toliver (7) || St. Elizabeths East Arena4,200
|-
| rowspan=5| Sunday, July 14 || 3:00 p.m. || Los Angeles Sparks || @ || Atlanta Dream || USA: NBA TV, WSB NowCanada: TSN4/5 || 76–71 (OT) || Hayes (24) || Billings (16) || C. Gray (9) || State Farm Arena5,083
|-
| rowspan=2| 4:00 p.m. || Connecticut Sun || @ || Indiana Fever || League Pass, NESN || 76–63 || J. Jones (26) || Tied (8) || J. Thomas (6) || Bankers Life Fieldhouse6,434
|-
| Chicago Sky || @ || Dallas Wings || League Pass, For Sports Southwest Plus || 89–79 || DeShields (26) || McGee-Stafford (8) || Vandersloot (8) || College Park Center4,261
|-
| rowspan=2| 7:00 p.m. || Phoenix Mercury || @ || Minnesota Lynx || USA:NBA TV, Fox Sports GoCanada: SN1 || 62–75 || Bonner (27) || Fowles (13) || Tied (5) || Target Center8,801
|-
| New York Liberty || @ || Seattle Storm || League Pass, JoeTV || 69–78 || Tied (19) || Canada (9) || Canada (8) || Alaska Airlines Arena6,733
|-
| rowspan=3| Wednesday, July 17 || 12:00 p.m. || Atlanta Dream || @ || Chicago Sky || Twitter, Bounce TV || 76–77 || Montgomery (23) || Breland (11) || Vandersloot (9) || Wintrust Arena10,143
|-
| 3:30 p.m. || Dallas Wings || @ || Phoenix Mercury || USA: NBA TV, Fox Sports Arizona, Fox Sports SouthwestCanada: NBA TV Canada || 64–69 || Griner (23) || McGee-Stafford (11) || January (5) || Talking Stick Resort Arena10,143
|-
| 8:00 p.m. || Seattle Storm || @ || Minnesota Lynx || USA: NBA TV, Fox Sports NorthCanada: NBA TV Canada || 90–79 || Howard (33) || Russell (9) || Robinson (10) || Target Center8,403
|-
| Thursday, July 18 || 3:30 p.m. || Dallas Wings || @ || Los Angeles Sparks || USA: NBA TV, Spectrum SportsnetCanada: NBA TV Canada || 64–69 || N. Ogwumike (22) || Tied (9) || Ogunbowale (7) || Staples Center14,050
|-
| rowspan=3| Friday, July 19 || 7:00 p.m. || Washington Mystics || @ || Indiana Fever || CBSSN, WNDY, Monumental || 95–88 || Delle Donne (28) || Delle Donne (15) || Cloud (7) || Bankers Life Fieldhouse6,726
|-
| 7:30 p.m. || Atlanta Dream || @ || Connecticut Sun || USA: NBA TV, NESN+, WSB NowCanada: SN1 || 69–98 || Sykes (26) || J. Jones (9) || C. Williams (5) || Mohegan Sun Arena6,733
|-
| 10:00 p.m. || Las Vegas Aces || @ || Seattle Storm || USA: NBA TVCanada: NBA TV Canada || 66–69 || Howard (21) || Cambage (16) || Canada (4) || Alaska Airlines Arena9,000
|-
| rowspan=2| Saturday, July 20 || 3:00 p.m. || Los Angeles Sparks || @ || New York Liberty || USA: NBA TV, Fox Sports Go, Spectrum Sports NetCanada: TSN2 || 78–83 || N. Ogwumike (20) || N. Ogwumike (12) || Tied (6) || Westchester County Center2,195
|-
| 8:00 p.m. || Phoenix Mercury || @ || Dallas Wings ||  USA: NBA TV, Fox Sports Southwest Plus, FSAZ+Canada: NBA TV Canada || 70–66 || Griner (17) || Plaisance (10) || January (4) || College Park Center5,471
|-
| rowspan=3| Sunday, July 21 || 3:00 p.m. || Atlanta Dream || @ || Washington Mystics ||  USA: NBA TV, NBC Sports Washington, Bounce TV/WSB NowCanada: NBA TV Canada || 65–93 || Delle Donne (28) || Tied (8) || Toliver (7) || St. Elizabeths East Arena4,200
|-
| rowspan=2| 6:00 p.m. || Indiana Fever || @ || Chicago Sky || USA: NBA TV, The U TooCanada: NBA TV Canada || 70–78 || Tied (19) || McCowan (16) || Vandersloot (14) || Wintrust Arena6,614
|-
| Minnesota Lynx || @ || Las Vegas Aces || League Pass, MYLVTV || 74–79 || Cambage (22) || Cambage (13) || Plum (8) || Mandalay Bay Events Center4,352
|-
| rowspan=3| Tuesday, July 23 || 7:00 p.m. || Los Angeles Sparks || @ || Atlanta Dream || Twitter || 78–66 || N. Ogwumike (24) || C. Ogwumike (12) || C. Gray (6) || State Farm Arena7,047
|-
| rowspan=2| 10:00 p.m. || Seattle Storm || @ || Las Vegas Aces|| USA: ESPN2Canada: TSN3/5 || 62–79 || Hamby (24) || Cambage (12) || Cambage (6) || Mandalay Bay Events Center5,193
|-
| Indiana Fever || @ || Phoenix Mercury || ESPN3, League Pass || 77–95 || Tied (22) || McCowan (9) || Wheeler (9) || Talking Stick Resort Arena8,528
|-
| rowspan=2| Wednesday, July 24 || 11:30 a.m. || New York Liberty || @ || Connecticut Sun || League Pass, NESN+ || 63–70 || J. Thomas (18) || A. Thomas (12) || J. Thomas (7) || Mohegan Sun Arena8,249
|-
| 1:00 p.m. || Washington Mystics || @ || Minnesota Lynx || USA: NBA TV, Fox Sports Go, MonumentalCanada: SN1 || 79–71 || Toliver (32) || Fowles (12) || Toliver (6) || Target Center17,934
|-style="background:#FAFAD2"
| Saturday, July 27 || 3:30 p.m. || Team Wilson || @ || Team Delle Donne || USA: ABCCanada: TSN5, SN1 || 129–126 || Wheeler (25) || J. Jones (13) || C. Gray (10) || Mandalay Bay Events Center9,157
|-
| rowspan=3| Tuesday, July 30 || rowspan=2| 7:00 p.m. || Chicago Sky || @ || Connecticut Sun || USA: NBA TV, NESN+, The U TooCanada: TSN4 || 94–100 || J. Jones (27) || J. Jones (11) || Vandersloot (11) || Mohegan Sun Arena6,358
|-
| Phoenix Mercury || @ || Washington Mystics || Twitter, NBC Sports Washington || 93–99 || Delle Donne (33) || Griner (9) || Mitchell (8) || St. Elizabeths East Arena3,819
|-
| 10:00 p.m. || Dallas Wings || @ || Las Vegas Aces || Twitter, MYLVTV || 54–86 || Tied (18) || Hamby (11) || J. Young (7) || Mandalay Bay Events Center3,756
|-
| Wednesday, July 31 || 7:00 p.m. || Atlanta Dream || @ || Indiana Fever || CBSSN || 59–61 || E. Williams (17) || McCowan (14) || Tied (4) || Bankers Life Fieldhouse5,702
|-

|-
| rowspan=3| Thursday, August 1 || 7:00 p.m. || Phoenix Mercury || @ || Connecticut Sun || CBSSN || 62–68 || Bonner (20) || J. Jones (14) || C. Williams (5) || Mohegan Sun Arena6,014
|-
| 8:00 p.m. || New York Liberty || @ || Dallas Wings || USA: NBA TV, Fox Sports SouthwestCanada: SN1 || 64–87 || Ogunbowale (22) || Gustafson (8) || A. Gray (9) || College Park Center4,011
|-
| 10:00 p.m. || Las Vegas Aces || @ || Los Angeles Sparks || USA: ESPN2Canada: NBA TV Canada || 68–76 || Tied (19) || Tied (11) || C. Gray (10) || Staples Center11,692
|-
| Friday, August 2 || 10:00 p.m. || Washington Mystics || @ || Seattle Storm || USA: NBA TV, JoeTV, MonumentalCanada: NBA TV Canada || 99–79 || Delle Donne (29) || Delle Donne (12) || Canada (6) || Angel of the Winds Arena7,488
|-
| rowspan=3| Saturday, August 3 || rowspan=2 | 7:00 p.m. || Chicago Sky || @ || Atlanta Dream || League Pass, WSB Now, The U Too || 87–78 || Bentley (21) || DeShields (12) || Vandersloot (9) || State Farm Arena5,427
|-
| Minnesota Lynx || @ || Indiana Fever || League Pass, Fox Sports Indiana, Fox Sports North Plus || 75–86 || K. Mitchell (20) || McCowan (8) || K. Mitchell (9) || Bankers Life Fieldhouse7,884
|-
| 8:00 p.m. || Las Vegas Aces || @ || Dallas Wings || USA: NBA TV, Fox Sports Southwest PlusCanada: NBA TV Canada || 75–70 || Ogunbowale (24) || Swords (10) || J. Young (5) || College Park Center5,882
|-
| rowspan=3| Sunday, August 4 || 3:00 p.m. || Connecticut Sun || @ || New York Liberty || USA: NBA TV, YES, WTICCanada: NBA TV Canada || 94–79 || C. Williams (28) || Tied (10) || Tied (5) || Westchester County Center1,927
|-
| 5:00 p.m. || Seattle Storm || @ || Los Angeles Sparks || USA: NBA TV, Spectrum SportsNetCanada: NBA TV Canada || 75–83 || Parker (21) || N. Ogwumike (10) || Gray (8) || Staples Center12,820
|-
| 6:00 p.m. || Washington Mystics || @ || Phoenix Mercury || League Pass, Monumental || 82–103 || Griner (26) || Griner (9) || Griner (8) || Talking Stick Resort Arena9,025
|-
| Tuesday, August 6 || 7:00 p.m. || Minnesota Lynx || @ || Atlanta Dream || Twitter || 85–69 || Collier (22) || Tied (11) || Collier (5) || State Farm Arena3,395
|-
| Wednesday, August 7 || 8:00 p.m. || New York Liberty || @ || Chicago Sky || Twitter, The U Too || 92–101 || Charles (24) || Lavender (10) || Vandersloot (8) || Wintrust Arena5,797
|-
| rowspan=3| Thursday, August 8 || 7:00 p.m. || Indiana Fever || @ || Washington Mystics || CBSSN, Monumental || 78–91 || Delle Donne (22) || Delle Donne (8) || Toliver (11) || St. Elizabeths East Arena3,013
|-
| rowspan=2| 10:00 p.m. || Phoenix Mercury || @ || Los Angeles Sparks || USA: ESPN2Canada: NBA TV Canada || 74–84 || Griner (27) || B. Turner (14) || Parker (6) || Staples Center10,345
|-
| Dallas Wings || @ || Seattle Storm || League Pass, JoeTV || 57–69 || Howard (23) || Howard (11) || Tied (6) || Angel of the Winds Arena6,268
|-
| rowspan=2| Friday, August 9 || 8:00 p.m. || Connecticut Sun || @ || Minnesota Lynx || CBSSN, Fox Sports Go, NESN+ || 57–89 || Fowles (17) || Fowles (12) || Sims (9) || Target Center8,892
|-
| 10:30 p.m. || Chicago Sky || @ || Las Vegas Aces || CBSSN, MYLVTV || 87–84 || Cambage (28) || Hamby (12) || Vandersloot (13) || Mandalay Bay Events Center4,200
|-
| rowspan=2| Saturday, August 10 || 4:00 p.m. || Atlanta Dream || @ || Indiana Fever || CBSSN || 82–87 || Hayes (34) || Tied (9) || Wheeler (7) || Bankers Life Fieldhouse7,923
|-
| 10:00 p.m. || Dallas Wings || @ || Phoenix Mercury || League Pass || 80–77 || Tied (23) || B. Turner (11) || Ogunbowale (4) || Talking Stick Resort Arena9,717
|-
| rowspan=4| Sunday, August 11 || rowspan=2| 3:00 p.m. || Seattle Storm || @ || New York Liberty || NBA TV, Fox Sports Go || 84–69 || Charles (22) || 3 tied (8) || Wright (7) || Barclays Center7,715
|-
| Minnesota Lynx || @ || Washington Mystics || League Pass, NBC Sports Washington || 78–101 || Meesseman (25) || Delle Donne (10) || Sims (8) || St. Elizabeths East Arena4,200
|-
| 5:00 p.m. || Chicago Sky || @ || Los Angeles Sparks || League Pass, Spectrum SportsNet || 81–84 || Gray (26) || Ogwumike (12) || Tied (6) || Staples Center9,244
|-
| 6:00 p.m. || Connecticut Sun || @ || Las Vegas Aces || USA: ESPN2Canada: NBA TV Canada, TSN2 || 81–89 || Cambage (21) || Tied (12) || Tied (6) || Mandalay Bay Events Center4,633
|-
| rowspan=2| Tuesday, August 13 || 7:00 p.m. || Minnesota Lynx || @ || New York Liberty || League Pass, Fox Sports Go || 89–73 || Allen (28) || Boyd (9) || Boyd (7) || Westchester County Center1,570
|-
| 10:00 p.m. || Atlanta Dream || @ || Las Vegas Aces || Twitter, MYLVTV || 90–94 || Hamby (23) || Hamby (16) || Bentley (7) || Mandalay Bay Events Center3,532
|-
| rowspan=3| Wednesday, August 14 || rowspan=2| 8:00 p.m. || Seattle Storm || @ || Washington Mystics || CBSSN, Monumental || 59–88 || Howard (24) || Tied (8) || Howard (4) || St. Elizabeths East Arena3,917
|-
| Los Angeles Sparks || @ || Dallas Wings || League Pass, Fox Sports Southwest || 78–84 || Ogunbowale (35) || Ogwumike (9) || Gray (7) || College Park Center5,004
|-
| 10:00 p.m. || Connecticut Sun || @ || Phoenix Mercury || USA: ESPN2 Canada: NBA TV Canada || 78–71 || J. Thomas (18) || J. Jones (14) || 3 tied (4) || Talking Stick Resort Arena8,734
|-
| rowspan=5| Friday, August 16 || 7:30 p.m. || Seattle Storm || @ || Connecticut Sun || League Pass, NESN+ || 78–79 || Howard (27) || A. Thomas (11) || J. Thomas (7) || Mohegan Sun Arena7,092
|-
| rowspan=3 | 8:00 p.m. || Los Angeles Sparks || @ || Chicago Sky || League Pass, The U Too, Spectrum Sportsnet || 81–91 || Quigley (26) || Ndour (9) || Vandersloot (9) || Wintrust Arena7,907
|-
| New York Liberty || @ || Dallas Wings || USA: CBSSNCanada: SN1 || 77–83 || Charles (25) || Wright (9) || Wright (7) || College Park Center4,070
|-
| Washington Mystics || @ || Minnesota Lynx || League Pass, Fox Sports Go, Monumnetal || 86–79 || Atkins (18) || Collier (9) || Tied (8) || Target Center8,803
|-
| 10:00 p.m. || Atlanta Dream || @ || Phoenix Mercury || CBSSN || 68–77 || Bonner (27) || Bonner (14) || Mitchell (5) || Talking Stick Resort Arena8,480
|-
| rowspan=5| Sunday, August 18 || rowspan=2| 3:00 p.m. || Dallas Wings || @ || Connecticut Sun || League Pass, NESN+ || 68–78 || Gray (22) || Harrison (13) || Thomas (9) || Mohegan Sun Arena7,275
|-
| Indiana Fever || @ || Washington Mystics || USA: NBA TV, NBC Sports WashingtonCanada: TSN5 || 68–107 || Delle Donne (25) || McCowan (10) || Cloud (8) || St. Elizabeths East Arena4,034
|-
| rowspan=2 | 6:00 p.m. || Las Vegas Aces || @ || Chicago Sky || USA: NBA TV, The U TooCanada: NBA TV Canada || 100–85 || DeShields (28) || Tied (10) || Vandersloot (9) || Wintrust Arena6,072
|-
| New York Liberty || @ || Phoenix Mercury || League Pass || 72–78 || Bonner (30) || Charles (13) || Tied (5) || Talking Stick Resort Arena9,145
|-
| 7:00 p.m. || Minnesota Lynx || @ || Seattle Storm || League Pass, JoeTV || 74–82 || Sims (30) || Tied (6) || Robinson (9) || Alaska Airlines Arena9,000
|-
| rowspan=4| Tuesday, August 20 || rowspan=2| 7:00 p.m. || Chicago Sky || @ || Atlanta Dream || Twitter, The U Too || 87–83 || Hayes (27) || Ndour (10) || Vandersloot (10) || State Farm Arena4,662
|-
| New York Liberty || @ || Indiana Fever || USA: NBA TV, WNDYCanada: NBA TV Canada || 82–76 || McCowan (24) || Charles (14) || Tied (5) || Bankers Life Fieldhouse5,340
|-
| 10:00 p.m. || Phoenix Mercury || @ || Las Vegas Aces || Twitter, MYLVTV || 79–84 (OT) || Tied (24) || Cambage (15) || J. Young (10) || Mandalay Bay Events Center5,032
|-
| 10:30 p.m. || Minnesota Lynx || @ || Los Angeles Sparks || USA: NBA TV, Spectrum SportsNetCanada: NBA TV Canada || 71–81 || Tied (20) || Parker (10) || Tied (4) || Staples Center9,244
|-
| rowspan=2| Thursday, August 22 || 8:00 p.m. || Dallas Wings || @ || Minnesota Lynx || USA: League PassCanada: NBA TV Canada || 70–86 || Ogunbowale (22) || Tied (7) || Dantas (8) || Target Center8,124
|-
| 10:30 p.m. || Indiana Fever || @ || Los Angeles Sparks || CBSSN, Spectrum SportsNet || 65–98 || N. Ogwumike (17) || 3 tied (7) || Wheeler (6) || Staples Center8,816
|-
| rowspan=3| Friday, August 23 || rowspan=2| 7:30 p.m. || Las Vegas Aces || @ || Connecticut Sun || USA: NBA TV, NESN+Canada: NBA TV Canada || 85–89 || A. Thomas (27) || A. Thomas (12) || J. Thomas (8) || Mohegan Sun Arena7,483
|-
| Atlanta Dream || @ || New York Liberty || CBSSN || 90–87 || Hayes (19) || Breland (12) || Tied (6) || Westchester County Center1,831
|-
| 8:00 p.m. || Washington Mystics || @ || Chicago Sky || League Pass, The U Too, Monumental || 78–85 || DeShields (22) || Vandersloot (8) || Vandersloot (9) || Wintrust Arena6,131
|-
| rowspan=6| Sunday, August 25 || 3:00 p.m. || New York Liberty || @ || Washington Mystics || USA: NBA TV, NBC Sports WashingtonCanada: SN1 || 72–101 || Nurse (24) || Delle Donne (10) || Hawkins (5) || St. Elizabeths East Arena4,200
|-
| 4:00 p.m. || Atlanta Dream || @ || Dallas Wings || League Pass, Fox Sports Southwest Plus || 77–73 || Ogunbowale (29) || Breland (12) || Bentley (4) || College Park Center4,715
|-
| 5:00 p.m. || Connecticut Sun || @ || Los Angeles Sparks || USA: NBA TV, Spectrum SportsNet, NESN+Canada: NBA TV Canada || 72–84 || R. Williams (21) || J. Jones (12) || Gray (6) || Staples Center17,076
|-
| 6:00 p.m. || Chicago Sky || @ || Phoenix Mercury || League Pass, Fox Sports Arizona, The U Too || 94–86 || Griner (34) || Parker (12) || Vandersloot (13) || Talking Stick Resort Arena12,054
|-
| rowspan=2| 7:00 p.m. || Las Vegas Aces || @ || Minnesota Lynx || USA: NBA TV, Fox Sports North Canada: TSN2 || 77–98 || Tied (23) || Hamby (7) || Robinson (8) || Target Center8,834
|-
| Indiana Fever || @ || Seattle Storm || League Pass, JoeTV || 63–54 || McCowan (22) || McCowan (19) || Howard (5) || Alaska Airlines Arena8,076
|-
| rowspan=5| Tuesday, August 27 || rowspan=3| 7:00 p.m. || Las Vegas Aces || @ || Indiana Fever || ESPN3, League Pass, WNDY || 71–86 || McCowan (24) || McCowan (17) || Plum (6) || Bankers Life Fieldhouse6,958
|-
| Phoenix Mercury || @ || New York Liberty || USA: ESPN3, League Pass, YESCanada: SN1 || 95–82 || Tied' (29) || Griner (14) || Taurasi (10) || Westchester County Center1,693
|-
| Los Angeles Sparks || @ || Washington Mystics || USA: ESPN2 Canada: NBA TV Canada || 66–95 || Powers (20) || Sanders (9) || Gray (7) || St. Elizabeths East Arena4,200
|-
| 8:00 p.m. || Chicago Sky || @ || Minnesota Lynx || ESPN3, League Pass, Fox Sports Go (Minnesota) || 85–93 || Fowles (25) || Fowles (12) || Vandersloot (10) || Target Center8,092
|-
| 10:00 p.m. || Connecticut Sun || @ || Seattle Storm || Twitter, JoeTV || 89–70 || A. Thomas (22) || A. Thomas (11) || Canada (5) || Alaska Airlines Arena6,258
|-
| rowspan=3| Thursday, August 29 || rowspan=2| 7:00 p.m. || Los Angeles Sparks || @ || Indiana Fever || League Pass, Fox Sports Indiana || 87–83 || Gray (30) || McCowan (10) || Gray (9) || Bankers Life Fieldhouse5,641
|-
| Phoenix Mercury || @ || Atlanta Dream || USA: NBA TV, WSB NowCanada: NBA TV Canada || 65–58 || Griner (21) || Breland (11) || Taurasi (8) || State Farm Arena3,727
|-
| 8:00 p.m. || Dallas Wings || @ || Chicago Sky || League Pass, The U Too || 88–83 || Ogunbowale (35) || Harrison (12) || Vandersloot (7) || Wintrust Arena5,614
|-
| Friday, August 30 || 7:30 p.m. || Connecticut Sun || @ || New York Liberty || USA: NBA TV, Fox Sports Go (New York), NESN+ Canada: TSN2 || 94–84 || C. Williams (26) || A. Thomas (9) || J. Thomas (7) || Westchester County Center1,791
|-
| rowspan=2| Saturday, August 31 || 8:00 p.m. || Washington Mystics || @ || Dallas Wings || USA: NBA TV, MonumentalCanada: NBA TV Canada || 91–85 || Ogunbowale (30) || Sanders (10) || Tied (7) || College Park Center5,205
|-
| 10:30 p.m. || Los Angeles Sparks || @ || Las Vegas Aces || USA: NBA TV, MYLVTVCanada: NBA TV Canada || 86–92 || R. Williams (37) || Tied (12) || Gray (7) || Mandalay Bay Events Center8,470
|-

|-
| rowspan=3| Sunday, September 1 || 6:00 p.m. || Phoenix Mercury || @ || Chicago Sky || League Pass, The U Too || 78–105 || Griner (26) || Bonner (12) || Vandersloot (13) || Wintrust Arena8,845
|-
| rowspan=2| 7:00 p.m. || Indiana Fever || @ || Minnesota Lynx || League Pass, Fox Sports North, Fox Sports Indiana || 73–81 || Dupree (18) || McCowan (11) || T. Mitchell (6) || Target Center8,833
|-
| Atlanta Dream || @ || Seattle Storm || USA: NBA TV, JoeTV, WSB NowCanada: NBA TV Canada || 75–92 || Canada (21) || Tied (8) || Canada (8) || Alaska Airlines Arena9,000
|-
| rowspan=3| Tuesday, September 3 || 7:00 p.m. || Washington Mystics || @ || New York Liberty || USA: NBA TV, Fox Sports Go (New York), MonumenalCanada: TSN2 || 93–77 || Delle Donne (30) || Tied (10) || Cloud (9) || Westchester County Center1,558
|-
| 10:00 p.m. || Seattle Storm || @ || Phoenix Mercury || ESPN2 || 82–70 || Tied (22) || Howard (12) || Canada (10) || Talking Stick Resort Arena8,724
|-
| 10:30 p.m. || Atlanta Dream || @ || Los Angeles Sparks || ESPN3, League Pass, Sectrum SportsNet || 60–70 || Parker (21) || Parker (11) || Parker (6) || Staples Center9,889
|-
| Wednesday, September 4 || 7:00 p.m. || Dallas Wings || @ || Connecticut Sun || CBSSN, NESN+ || 72–102 || Ogunbowale (32) || C. Williams (8) || Hiedeman (9) || Mohegan Sun Arena6,284
|-
| rowspan=2| Thursday, September 5 || 7:00 p.m. || Las Vegas Aces || @ || Atlanta Dream || CBSSN || 74–78 || E. Williams (20) || Billings (14) || J. Young (9) || State Farm Arena4,023
|-
| 10:30 p.m. || Seattle Storm || @ || Los Angeles Sparks || CBSSN, Spectrum SportsNet || 68–102 || Parker (20) || N. Ogwumike (10) || Gray (9) || Staples Center10,591
|-
| rowspan=4| Friday, September 6 || rowspan=2| 7:00 p.m. || Dallas Wings || @ || Washington Mystics || Twitter, NBCSWA+, Monumental || 73–86 || Ogunbowale (30) || Meesseeman (10) || Ogunbowale (6) || St. Elizabeths East Arena3,963
|-
| Indiana Fever || @ || New York Liberty || USA: League Pass, YESCanada: SN1 || 86–81 || K. Mitchell (22) || McCowan (13) || Tied (7) || Westchester County Center2,301
|-
| 7:30 p.m. || Chicago Sky || @ || Connecticut Sun || League Pass, NESN+, The U Too || 109–104 || DeShields (30) || 3 tied (9) || Vandersloot (11) || Mohegan Sun Arena8,077
|-
| 10:00 p.m. || Minnesota Lynx || @ || Phoenix Mercury || League Pass, Fox Sports Arizona, Fox Sports North Plus || 83–69 || Sims (22) || Fowles (11) || Sims (9) || Talking Stick Resort Arena12,140
|-
| rowspan=6| Sunday, September 8 || rowspan=6 | 4:00 p.m. || New York Liberty || @ || Atlanta Dream || ESPN3, League Pass, WSB Now || 71–63 || Bentley (17) || Breland (12) || Charles (5) || State Farm Arena5,495
|-
| Connecticut Sun || @ || Indiana Fever || ESPN3, League Pass, WNDY, WTIC || 76–104 || K. Mitchell (38) || B. Jones (10) || Laney (7) || Bankers Life Fieldhouse5,451
|-
| Chicago Sky || @ || Washington Mystics || ESPN3, League Pass, Monumental || 86–100 || Delle Donne (25) || Delle Donne (12) || Tied (6) || St. Elizabeths East Arena4,200
|-
| Seattle Storm || @ || Dallas Wings || ESPN3, League Pass, Fox Sports Southwest Plus || 78–64 || Ogunbowale (25) || Howard (9) || 3 tied (5) || College Park Center5,910
|-
| Las Vegas Aces || @ || Phoenix Mercury || ESPN3, League Pass, Fox Sports Arizona || 98–89 || Griner (24) || Cambage (9) || Tied (4) || Talking Stick Resort Arena13,135
|-
| Minnesota Lynx || @ || Los Angeles Sparks || USA: ESPN2Canada: NBA TV Canada || 68–77 || Collier (16) || Collier (11) || Dantas (9) || Staples Center13,500
|-

|-
! style="background:#094480; color:white" | 2019 WNBA postseason
|-

|-
| rowspan=2| September 11 || 8:00 p.m. || Phoenix Mercury || @ || Chicago Sky || USA: ESPN2Canada: SN1 || 76–105 || DeShields (25) || Ndour (9) || Vandersloot (11) || Wintrust Arena6,042
|-
| 10:00 p.m. || Minnesota Lynx || @ || Seattle Storm || USA: ESPN2Canada: TSN2 || 78–84 || Canada (26) || Fowles (11) || Howard (6) || Angel of the Winds Arena5,011
|-

|-
| rowspan=2| September 15 || 3:00 p.m. || Seattle Storm || @ || Los Angeles Sparks || USA: ESPN2Canada: SN1 || 69–92 || Gray (21) || Howard (11) || Gray (8) || Staples Center9,081
|-
| 5:00 p.m. || Chicago Sky || @ || Las Vegas Aces || USA: ESPN2Canada: TSN2 || 92–93 || Tied (23) || Cambage (17) || Vandersloot (12) || Thomas & Mack Center7,981
|-

|-
| rowspan=2| September 17 || 6:30 p.m. || Los Angeles Sparks || @ || Connecticut Sun || USA: ESPN2Canada: SN1 || 75–84 || Parker (24) || 3 tied (10) || J. Thomas (8) || Mohegan Sun Arena7,102
|-
| 8:30 p.m. || Las Vegas Aces || @ || Washington Mystics || USA: ESPN2Canada: TSN4/5 || 95–97 || Meesseman (27) || Cambage (12) || Plum (9) || St. Elizabeth's East Arena3,986
|-
| rowspan=2| September 19 || 6:30 p.m. || Los Angeles Sparks || @ || Connecticut Sun || USA: ESPN2Canada: TSN3 || 68–94 || J. Jones (27) || Tied (13) || J. Thomas (7) || Mohegan Sun Arena8,051
|-
| 8:30 p.m. || Las Vegas Aces || @ || Washington Mystics || USA: ESPN2Canada: TSN3 || 91–103 || Meesseman (30) || Tied (10) || Cloud (11) || St. Elizabeth's East Arena4,200
|-
| rowspan=2| September 22 || 5:00 p.m. || Washington Mystics || @ || Las Vegas Aces || USA: ESPN2Canada: TSN5 || 75–92 || Cambage (28) || Tied (8) || Plum (9) || Mandalay Bay Events Center6,175
|-
| 7:00 p.m. || Connecticut Sun || @ || Los Angeles Sparks || USA: ESPN2Canada: SN1 || 78–56 || J. Thomas (29) || C. Williams (13) || A. Thomas (6) || Walter Pyramid4,000
|-
| September 24 || 9:00 p.m. || Washington Mystics || @ || Las Vegas Aces || USA: ESPN2Canada: TSN5 || 94–90 || Tied (25) || Cambage (12) || Tied (9) || Mandalay Bay Events Center5,465
|-

|-
| September 29 || 3:00 p.m. || Connecticut Sun || @ || Washington Mystics || USA: ESPNCanada: TSN5 || 86–95 || C. Williams (26) || Delle Donne (10) || Cloud (7) || St. Elizabeth's East Arena4,200
|-
| October 1 || 8:00 p.m. || Connecticut Sun || @ || Washington Mystics || USA: ESPNCanada: TSN2 || 99–87 || J. Jones (32) || J. Jones (18) || Toliver (7) || St. Elizabeth's East Arena4,200
|-
| October 6 || 3:30 p.m. || Washington Mystics || @ || Connecticut Sun || USA: ABCCanada: SN360 || 94–81 || Meesseman (21) || J. Jones (9) || Toliver (10) || Mohegan Sun Arena 9,170
|-
| October 8 || 8:00 p.m. || Washington Mystics || @ || Connecticut Sun || USA: ESPN2Canada: TSN4/5 || 86–90 || J. Jones (18) || J. Jones (13) || A. Thomas (11) || Mohegan Sun Arena8,458
|-
| October 10 || 8:00 p.m. || Connecticut Sun || @ || Washington Mystics || USA: ESPN2Canada: TSN4 || 89–78 || J. Jones (25) || A. Thomas (12) || Tied (6) || St. Elizabeth's East Arena4,200
|-

Playoffs

The WNBA continued its current playoff format for 2019. The top eight teams, regardless of conference, make the playoffs, with the top two teams receiving a bye to the semi-finals. The remaining six teams play in two single-elimination playoff rounds, with the third and fourth seeds receiving a bye to the second round.

 Season award winners 

 Player of the Week Award 

 Player of the Month Award 

 Rookie of the Month Award 

 Coach of the Month Award 

Postseason awards

 Coaches 

 Eastern Conference 

 Western Conference Notes:''
 Year with team does not include 2019 season.
 Records are from time at current team and are through the end of the 2018 season.
 Playoff appearances are from time at current team only.
 WNBA Finals and Championships do not include time with other teams.
 Coaches shown are the coaches who began the 2019 season as head coach of each team.

References

 
Women's National Basketball Association seasons